Lea Theodora Bouwmeester (born 3 October 1979 in Hoogeveen) is a Dutch politician and former civil servant and social counselor. She is a member of the Labour Party (Partij van de Arbeid) and was an MP between 30 November 2006 and 23 March 2017. She focused on matters of prison system, mental health care, addiction and drug rehabilitation.

Bouwmeester went on pregnancy and maternity leave from 1 March 2016 to 10 June 2016 and was temporarily replaced by Harm Brouwer.

Bouwmeester studied social rights service at Amsterdam University of Applied Sciences.

References 
  Parlement.com biography

External links 
  House of Representatives biography

1979 births
Living people
Dutch civil servants
Labour Party (Netherlands) politicians
Members of the House of Representatives (Netherlands)
Municipal councillors of Almere
People from Hoogeveen
21st-century Dutch politicians
21st-century Dutch women politicians